This is a list of members of the Western Australian Legislative Assembly from 1968 to 1971:

Notes
 On 14 April 1970, the Labor member for Albany, Jack Hall, resigned. Labor candidate Wyndham Cook won the resulting by-election on 6 June 1970.

Members of Western Australian parliaments by term